Matisse Museum may refer to the following museums in France:
Matisse Museum (Le Cateau)
Musée Matisse (Nice)